Ricardo Camargo (born 14 May 1968) is a former professional tennis player from Brazil.

Biography
Camargo, who comes from São Paulo, was a Wimbledon semi-finalist as a junior, in the boys' doubles event in 1986.

On the professional tour he competed mostly in doubles and reached three quarter-finals on the Grand Prix/ATP Tour doubles circuit. At Challenger level he won three doubles titles, all with Givaldo Barbosa in the 1988 season. He made the second round of the singles event at the Guaruja Grand Prix tournament in 1989, with a win over Ivan Kley.

He now works as a tennis event promoter.

Challenger titles

Doubles: (3)

References

External links
 
 

1968 births
Living people
Brazilian male tennis players
Tennis players from São Paulo
21st-century Brazilian people
20th-century Brazilian people